Fljótsdalshreppur is a municipality in Iceland. The power house of Kárahnjúkar Hydropower Plant is located in Fljótsdalur. The author Gunnar Gunnarsson was born in Fljótsdalur and in 1939 built a house at Skriðuklaustur designed by German architect Fritz Höger.

Geography
The municipality is located in the valley Fljótsdalur (Valley of the River) close to the glacier of Vatnajökull, to the lake of Lagarfljót and south of the forest of Hallormstaður. Hengifoss, the third highest waterfall in Iceland, 128 meters, is located in Hengifossá in Fljótsdalshreppur.

References

Municipalities of Iceland